TRU (an abbreviation of The Real Untouchables) was an American hip hop group from New Orleans, active from 1989 to 2005. The group originally consisted of rappers on the New Orleans-founded record label, No Limit Records. The members are brothers Master P, C-Murder, and Silkk the Shocker.

The group released six albums, incorporating the typical No Limit formula of G-funk rhythms married to hardcore gangsta lyrics.

History
The group originally consisted of Master P, C-Murder, Silkk the Shocker. King George, Big Ed the Assassin, Cali G, Sonya C, Chilee Powdah and Milkman, before being shortened to just Master P, C-Murder and Silkk the Shocker. The group's first two releases, 1993's Who's Da Killer? and 1992's Understanding the Criminal Mind, were released independently through In-a-minute Records. In 1995, the group released their third album, True on No Limit Records, which had been established the previous year. In 1997, the group was shortened to include just the three Miller brothers and the trio released their fourth album, Tru 2 da Game, followed by Da Crime Family in 1999. However, by 2003, No Limit had fallen on hard times and was shut down. TRU returned in 2004 on Koch Records, released their sixth and final album, The Truth.

Discography

Studio albums
Understanding the Criminal Mind (1992)
Who's da Killer? (1993)
True (1995)
Tru 2 da Game (1997)
Da Crime Family (1999)
The Truth (2005)

Members
Former members
Master P  (1989–2005)
C-Murder (1989–2005)
Silkk the Shocker (1989–2005)
Big Ed (deceased)  (1992–1995)
Calli-G  (1989–1995)
Chilee Powdah  (1989–1993)
King George   (1989–1995)
Milk Man  (1989–1994)
Halleluyah  (2005)

Filmography
1997: I'm Bout It
1998: I Got the Hook-Up
1998: MP da Last Don
1999: Hot Boyz
2002: Undisputed

References

External links
Biography at AllMusic

Southern hip hop groups
Musical groups from New Orleans
No Limit Records artists
Gangsta rap groups
Musical groups established in 1989
Musical groups disestablished in 2005
Sibling musical groups